Noise pop is a subgenre of alternative and indie rock that developed in the mid-1980s in the United Kingdom and United States. It is defined by its mixture of dissonant noise or feedback with the songcraft more often found in pop music. Shoegazing, another noise-based genre that developed in the 1980s, drew from noise pop.

History and characteristics 

Noise pop has been described by AllMusic as "the halfway point between bubblegum and the avant-garde"; the combination of conventional pop songwriting with experimental sounds of white noise, distorted guitars and drones. Accordingly, the style "often has a hazy, narcotic feel, as melodies drift through the swirling guitar textures. But it can also be bright and lively, or angular and challenging." AllMusic cites the Velvet Underground as the earliest roots of the genre, with their experiments with feedback and distortion on their early albums.

Early American alternative rock bands like Sonic Youth, Yo La Tengo, Hüsker Dü and Dinosaur Jr., who mixed pop song structures with extreme guitar distortion and feedback, were immediate forerunners. The Jesus and Mary Chain's 1985 debut, Psychocandy, is considered by AllMusic to be the archetype for the noise pop genre ("pretty much birthed the style"). Kareem Estefan of Stylus Magazine cited the album for "transforming the use of distortion in indie rock with its screeching abrasion, yet managing to feature some of the catchiest melodies of the 80s."

Later in the 1980s, noise pop was a major inspiration for the British shoegazing movement. Influenced by The Jesus and Mary Chain, My Bloody Valentine started to experiment with a fusion of 1960s pop music and noise on their EP, The New Record by My Bloody Valentine, paving way to their forthcoming shoegazing sound. Noise pop continued to be influential in the indie rock scene into the 1990s.

See also 
 No wave
 Noise Pop Festival

References 

 
Alternative rock genres
British rock music genres
American rock music genres